Africaine (Q196) ("African") was an  of the French Navy.

Still incomplete, she was captured by the Germans in June 1940 during World War II. She was renamed UF-1 on 13 May 1941 by the Kriegsmarine, but never completed during the German occupation of France.

She was recaptured, completed under her original name, and launched on 7 December 1946. Africaine  was taken out of service in 1961 and was stricken on 28 February 1963 as Q334.

See also

List of submarines of France

Notes and references

Aurore-class submarines
Ships built in France
1946 ships
World War II submarines of France
World War II submarines of Germany
Cold War submarines of France
Naval ships of France captured by Germany during World War II